George Nazos (Greek: Γιώργος Νάζος Giórgios Názos) (1862 – 1934) was a Greek music teacher and director of the Athens Conservatoire. He was from a well-known family from Tinos Island. He was recognized for his musical talent at a young age. In 1881 he went to Munich, Germany to study piano and advanced theory, returning to Greece in 1886.

Career 
In 1891, Nazos was appointed musical director of the Athens Conservatory, which he reorganized by hiring foreign teachers. Specifically, he proceeded to Germanize the curriculum, perhaps influenced by his studies in Munich, and apply progressive educational methods, which led to the founding of the Conservatory's student orchestra, the first incarnation of what was to become the Athens State Orchestra upon nationalization. He also founded or was important to the founding of the Conservatory's drama, opera, Byzantine, and military band departments, and contributed to Greek legislation pertaining to music education. As a teacher, he taught in piano, voice, and music theory.

In his field, he dealt with scientific research and the collection of Greek traditional songs from the Peloponnesus and Crete. This research work was published in Athens under the title of Peninta dimódi ásmata Peloponnisou kai Kritis (Fifty traditional songs from Peloponnesus and Crete).

Nazos was a dedicated professional musician, and his contribution to conservatories, schools, orchestras, and theatre was significant. Through 30 years of effort, he laid the foundations of Greek music education.

References 
 Katochianou, A., Tiliakos, K. & Tselikas I. (Eds.). (2004). ). Egkyklopaidiko Lexiko tis Klasikis Mousikis. [Εncyclopedic dictionary of Classical Music]. Athens: Lambrakis Press Group.
 Leotsakos G. (n.d.). Greek Music: Music of Modern Greece. The Athens Conservatory and the National School. Retrieved from http://www.musicportal.gr/greek_modern_music_athens_conservatoire/?lang=en
 Leotsakos G. (2012). Light under a bushel: Piano works by Greek composers 1847-1908. ( Griogorea Elena, Trans.), Athens: Papagrigoriou K. – Nakas X.
 Nazos, G. (1931). I perisyllogi ton dimodon asmaton. [The collection of folk songs]. Mousika Chronika. 3, 1-4.
 Patsis, C. (1979). Nea Elliniki Egkyklopaideia. [New Greek encyclopedia]. (Vol. 18, p. 228 – 229). Athens: Charis Tzo Patsis.
 Pournara, E. & Bougas, N. (Eds.). (2001). Encyclopaedia Papyros – Laroussse – Britannica. (Vol. 44, pp. 304). Athens: Papyrus Press Group.
 Romanou K. (2009). Serbian & Greek Art Music – A Patch to Western Music History. Chicago, IL: The University of Chicago Press.

1862 births
1934 deaths
Music educators
Greek educators